Burls Will Be Burls is an outdoor 2009 bronze sculpture by American artist Bruce Conkle, located in Portland, Oregon.

Description and history

Burls Will Be Burls was designed by Bruce Conkle and completed in 2009 as a tribute to snowmen and to the forests of the Pacific Northwest. It is installed at the intersection of Southwest 6th Avenue and West Burnside. The art installation consists of three cast bronze figures representing "what might happen when a snowman melts and nourishes a nearby living tree", as "water is absorbed by the roots and carries the spirit of the melted snowman up into the tree where it manifests itself as burls".

The three snowmen measure  x  x ,  x  x ,
and  x  x , respectively. The work is part of the City of Portland and Multnomah County Public Art Collection courtesy of the Regional Arts & Culture Council. It has been included in at least one published walking tour of Portland.

See also

 2009 in art

References

External links
 Bruce Conkle: Hallie Ford Fellow in the Visual Arts 2011 at The Ford Family Foundation
 Burls will be Burls (October 20, 2014) at Art and Architecture – San Francisco
 Green Line Public Art Tour Audio Transcript: Burls Will be Burls, Bruce Conkle at TriMet

2009 establishments in Oregon
2009 sculptures
Bronze sculptures in Oregon
Outdoor sculptures in Portland, Oregon
Sculptures by American artists
Sculptures on the MAX Green Line
Southwest Portland, Oregon
Statues in Portland, Oregon